Vat Blue 36 is a vat dye that is chemically related to indigo. It is produced by condensation of 4-methyl-5-chloro-7-methoxy-3-indolinone and 5,7–dichloro-3-(2H)-thianaphthenone.

References 

Indigo structure dyes
Vat dyes
Benzothiophenes
Chloroarenes
Phenol ethers
Indolines